Rudauli  is a town, tehsil and a municipal board in Faizabad district in the Indian state of Uttar Pradesh. Rudauli is 50 km west of the district headquarters Ayodhya.

Geography
It has an average elevation of 105 metres (344 feet).

Demographics

 India census, Rudauli had a population of 36,804. Males constitute 52% of the population and females 48%. Rudauli has an average literacy rate of 47%, lower than the national average of 59.5%: male literacy is 53%, and female literacy is 40%. In Rudauli, 17% of the population is under 6 years of age.

Governance and politics

Civic administration
Rudauli is also a block in Faizabad district in Uttar Pradesh. There is a police station in Rudauli.

Transportation

Road
Rudauli is well connected with nearby cities of Faizabad, Ayodhya Barabanki and Lucknow, and also with Sohawal, Mawai, Milkipur, Kumarganj, Goshainganj and Bikapur towns of Faizabad district, Uttar Pradesh.

Railway
Rudauli, Faizabad Junction, Ayodhya Junction and Goshainganj are the nearest railway stations.

Air
Ayodhya Airport is the nearest airport to the town.

Notable people
 Majaz, Urdu poet and maternal uncle of Javed Akhtar
 Phoolchand Gupta, Hindi and Gujarati poet, writer and translator
 Parwana Rudaulvi, Urdu Poet, Journalist, Writer and Translator

References

 http://www.rudauli.co.in

Cities and towns in Faizabad district